The 1982 Polish Speedway season was the 1982 season of motorcycle speedway in Poland.

Individual

Polish Individual Speedway Championship
The 1982 Individual Speedway Polish Championship final was held on 22 July at Zielona Góra.

Golden Helmet
The 1982 Golden Golden Helmet organised by the Polish Motor Union (PZM) was the 1982 event for the league's leading riders. The final was held on 17 October at Leszno.

+ not awarded a medal because they were a guest rider

Pairs

Polish Pairs Speedway Championship
The 1982 Polish Pairs Speedway Championship was the 1982 edition of the Polish Pairs Speedway Championship. The final was held on 21 August at Gorzów Wielkopolski.

Junior Championship
 winner - Maciej Jaworek

Silver Helmet
 winner - Maciej Jaworek

Team

Team Speedway Polish Championship
The 1982 Team Speedway Polish Championship was the 1982 edition of the Team Polish Championship. 

Falubaz Zielona Góra won the gold medal for the second successive season. The team included Andrzej Huszcza, Henryk Olszak, Jan Krzystyniak and Maciej Jaworek.

First League

Second League

References

Poland Individual
Poland Team
Speedway
1982 in Polish speedway